Kelly Rissling (born January 16, 1960) is a Canadian retired professional ice hockey player.

Born in 1960 in Edmonton, Alberta, Rissling played in the Western Hockey League with the Lethbridge Broncos and Portland Winterhawks. He began his professional career in during the 1981-82 season, and played 134 professional games in the Atlantic Coast Hockey League and the International Hockey League to register 46 goals and 78 assists for 124 points before joining a 2nd League team in Kempten, Germany for some games in the 1985-86 season.

Personal information 
Rissling lives in Edmonton, Alberta where he is a practicing real estate agent. His son Jaynen played professional hockey in the ECHL from 2014 until 2020.

References

External links

1960 births
Taber Golden Suns players
Atlantic Coast Hockey League players
Canadian ice hockey centres
Flint Generals players
Kalamazoo Wings (1974–2000) players
Lethbridge Broncos players
Living people
Portland Winterhawks players
Canadian real estate agents
Salem Raiders players
Ice hockey people from Edmonton